Four Portages 157C is an Indian reserve of the Lac La Ronge Indian Band in Saskatchewan. It is 23 miles north-east of La Ronge, and on the north shore of Lac la Ronge.

References

Indian reserves in Saskatchewan
Division No. 18, Saskatchewan